Six the Hardway an early 1960s rock band founded by Chuck Girard with drummer Ernie Earnshaw. The band became the initial studio recording musicians for Gary Usher, who co-wrote a couple of Beach Boys songs with Brian Wilson. Under the name Revells, Mercury Records released the single Little Honda, which made the top ten list. And as the group The Hondells, recorded the hit Younger Girl.

American rock music groups